Clara Sue Kidwell (born July 8, 1941) is a Native American academic scholar, historian, feminist and Native American author. She is enrolled in the Choctaw Nation of Oklahoma and of White Earth Ojibwe descent. She is considered to be a "major figure in the development of American Indian Studies programs."

Biography 
Kidwell was born in Tahlequah, Oklahoma, in 1941. Kidwell grew up in Muskogee, Oklahoma, and she was named for her two grandmothers, with whom she had a very close relationship as a child. Her paternal grandmother helped raise her while her parents worked as clerks at the Bureau of Indian Affairs. Kidwell attributes her focus on attention to detail to her childhood experiences learning from her parents to keep copies of everything and how to pay close attention to grammar from a high school teacher, Glady Nunn. In 1959 Kidwell graduated from Central High School and went on to attend the University of Oklahoma (OU). Kidwell received her bachelor's degree in 1963. While she was an undergraduate, she made the College Bowl Team which led to her receiving a fellowship in the history of science after she graduated with her bachelor's degree. She earned her master's in 1966 from OU. She finally received her Ph.D from the University of Oklahoma in 1970.

Kidwell began to teach American Indian studies in 1970 at Haskell Indian Junior College (now Haskell Indian Nations University). She worked at Haskell for two years until she left to be an associate professor at the University of California at Berkeley where she worked until 1993. At Berkeley, her "research and publication flourished" and she received fellowships from the Newberry Library and the Smithsonian Institution. In 1980, she was a visiting scholar and associate professor at Dartmouth College. After Berkeley, she took her career in a new direction as the assistant director for cultural resources at the National Museum of the American Indian. She helped move one million different pieces from the George Gustav Heye's Museum of the American Indian from New York to Washington, D.C. In 1995, she chose a tenured position at the University of Oklahoma as the director of the Native American studies program. She contributed the piece "Native Americans: Restoring the Power of Thought Woman" to the 2003 anthology Sisterhood Is Forever: The Women's Anthology for a New Millennium, edited by Robin Morgan.

In 2007, Kidwell started the American Indian Center (AIC) at the University of North Carolina (UNC). One of her major goals at AIC was to reach out to the many Eastern tribes such as the Lumbee Tribe of North Carolina and Coharie Intra-tribal Council, Inc., who are unable to qualify for federal recognition with the Bureau of Indian Affairs for various reasons. Under Kidwell's leadership, AIC has had success in North Carolina increasing programs that address education, health, and child welfare for these kinds of state-recognized tribes. She has also helped increase the "visibility of Native history and culture on campus." Kidwell retired from her position as director of AIC in June 2011.

Selected bibliography

References

External links 
 Biography at Vocal and Verbal Arts Archives

1941 births
American feminists
American people of Ojibwe descent
American women historians
Choctaw Nation of Oklahoma people
Feminist historians
Living people
Native American women writers
Native American feminists
Historians of Native Americans
Native American writers
Native American academics
University of Oklahoma alumni
Women Christian theologians
21st-century Native American women
21st-century Native Americans
20th-century Native American women
20th-century Native Americans